Marcel Massé  (born June 23, 1940) is a Canadian politician and civil servant.

Biography 
Massé was born in Montreal, Quebec in 1940 and graduated from McGill University and Pembroke College, Oxford (as Rhodes Scholar in 1963). He served as Clerk of the Privy Council in 1979 during the government of Prime Minister Joe Clark. In his distinguished public service career, he also served as President of the Canadian International Development Agency, on two occasions; was undersecretary for external affairs; and represented Canada as its executive director at the International Monetary Fund, World Bank and Inter-American Development Bank.

Massé's career in elected politics began when he ran as a candidate for Jean Chrétien's Liberal Party in the 1993 federal election. He was elected to the House of Commons of Canada as Member of Parliament for Hull—Aylmer. The incumbent, Gilles Rocheleau, had joined the sovereigntist Bloc Québécois in 1990 after the Meech Lake Accord failed. However, Rocheleau found himself running as a sovereigntist in a strongly federalist riding. Massé routed him by almost 13,700 votes, reverting the seat to its traditional status as a Liberal stronghold; before Rocheleau's brief stint in the Bloc, the riding had been in Liberal hands without interruption since its creation in 1914.

Following the election, he was appointed to the Canadian Cabinet as Minister of Intergovernmental Affairs, President of the Queen's Privy Council for Canada and Minister responsible for Public Service Renewal.

In 1996, a Cabinet shuffle moved him to the positions of President of the Treasury Board and Minister responsible for Infrastructure.

Massé was re-elected in the 1997 election, but retired from Cabinet in 1999 and resigned his seat in the House of Commons.

In 1985, he was made an Officer of the Order of Canada.

After the Liberal Party of Canada's leadership convention in December 2006 he was asked to join the transition team of newly elected leader Stéphane Dion. He served as Dion's Principal Secretary in the Office of the Leader of the Official Opposition for a period after Dion's selection as leader.  He later left the post for health reasons.

Electoral record

External links
 

1940 births
Canadian King's Counsel
Canadian Rhodes Scholars
Members of the 26th Canadian Ministry
Members of the House of Commons of Canada from Quebec
Liberal Party of Canada MPs
Officers of the Order of Canada
Lawyers in Quebec
Members of the King's Privy Council for Canada
Clerks of the Privy Council (Canada)
Living people